Latorica Protected Landscape Area is the second lowland protected landscape area in Slovakia. It is located in the south-eastern Slovakia, in the Trebišov and Michalovce districts.

Geography, geology and ecology
The park is located around the Slovak part of Latorica river and around lower part of Ondava and Laborec rivers. The landscape area consists of the system of riverbeds and arms, surrounded by alluvial forest and wetlands. The most noticeable phenomenon of the PLA is the rare water and swamp biocenose, unique in Slovakia.

A part of river's watershed ("Ramsar site No. 606", 44.05 km²) was added to the Ramsar list of wetlands of international importance since 1993.

Fauna 
There were recorded 82 species of molluscs in the Latorica PLA: 36 species of terrestrial gastropods and 46 species of freshwater molluscs.

Due to the location and character of this PLA, the area is used by waterfowl, not only for nesting, but also, in the case of migratory birds, for short rests.

References

External links
Protected landscape area Latorica at Slovakia.travel
Latorica Protected Landscape Area at The Slovak Nature Conservancy

Protected areas of Slovakia
IUCN Category V
Ramsar sites in Slovakia
Protected areas established in 1990
1990 establishments in Slovakia
Geography of Košice Region
Tourist attractions in Košice Region